Domenico Corcione (20 April 1929 – 3 January 2020) was an Italian military staff and defence minister of Italy.

Early life and education
Corcione was born in Turin on 20 April 1929. He entered Modena Military Academy in 1950 and graduated in 1952.

Career
Corcione was a general and served as the chief of the defence staff. Then he was appointed defence minister, being the first military figure to hold the post in the history of the Italian Republic. He was appointed to the post on 17 January 1995 and served in the cabinet led by the Prime Minister Lamberto Dini until 17 May 1996.

Death
On 3 January 2020, Corcione died in Turin at age 90.

Decorations

References

External links

20th-century Italian politicians
1929 births
2020 deaths
Chiefs of Defence Staff (Italy)
Italian generals
Italian Ministers of Defence
Military personnel from Turin
Recipients of the Order of Military Merit (Brazil)
Independent politicians in Italy